Suburban Journals of Greater St. Louis  was a group of publications in the St. Louis region owned by Lee Enterprises. The chain served St. Louis and St. Charles counties in Missouri and Madison, Monroe and St. Clair counties in Illinois.

It published community newspapers, the Ladue News, Savvy Family, St. Louis' Best Bridal and Feast. 

Publications were grouped in regional offices in Town and Country, Missouri and Collinsville, Illinois.

The chain for years was distributed to homes for free. The papers became subscription-only in November 2008, a move decried by long-time employees as "the beginning of the end.".

The chain's main competition was the Webster-Kirkwood Times, The South County Times and Call Newspapers in Missouri and The Alton Telegraph, Edwardsville Intelligencer, and Belleville News-Democrat in Illinois.

Relationship with St. Louis Post-Dispatch
The newspapers are independent of the Lee-owned St. Louis Post-Dispatch, but share some resources, such a technical assistance and printing.

The companies, which were previously owned by Pulitzer Inc., also share a common website, stltoday.com.

The papers were printed at Donnelly Printing Company on Latty Avenue in north St. Louis County for years, then later at the Pulitzer Publishing Center in Maryland Heights, Missouri.

Notable staff
Comedian Kathleen Madigan worked for the Suburban Journals for approximately 18 months in the late 1980s after graduation from SIU-Edwardsville.
Steve Pokin, a reporter and columnist for the St. Charles Journal, in November 2007 broke the story of Megan Meier, a Dardenne Prairie, Missouri, teen who committed suicide after being scorned by a fictitious friend on the social networking site MySpace.
Todd Smith, a reporter for the Kirkwood-Webster Journal, was shot in the hand during the February 2008 shooting inside City Hall in Kirkwood, Mo. He was later laid off as part of cutbacks.

History
Most of the publications currently owned by Suburban Journals date to the early 1900s as independent newspapers. Many were in direct competition with one another.

By the 1930s, the big adversaries in south St. Louis were the South Side Journal —renamed from the Cherokee News after Frank X. Bick bought it in 1933 — and 39th Street Neighborhood News, launched in the summer of 1922 by ex-Post Dispatch composing room worker Bernard H. Nordmann. Bick's son, Frank C. Bick, helped shape the fledgling chain, which grew to include 10 publications in St. Louis City, as well as St. Louis, Jefferson and Franklin counties.

Meanwhile, in northern St. Louis, Arthur Morgan Donnelly bought the Wellston Local in 1935 and rebranded it as the Wellston Journal, focusing more on north and central areas of the city. Donnelly, with his sons James and Robert, later shifted attention to northern and western St. Louis County, St. Charles County and eventually spread eastwards across the Mississippi River to include the Illinois counties of Madison, St. Clair, and Monroe; ultimately publishing 25 separate newspapers in the bi-state metropolitan St. Louis area.

The Donnelly and Bick families competed against one another until 1970, when operations were eventually and cooperatively formalized as sister companies, creating the Suburban Newspapers of Greater St. Louis; more commonly known as Suburban Journals. Circulation topped 820,000 households, making it one of the largest free-distribution community newspaper groups in the United States.

In May 1984, the group was snapped up by Ingersoll Publications Co., a firm headed by Ralph Ingersoll II, whose father lead the innovative PM newspaper in 1940s New York City.

Ingersoll, who wanted to compete with the Post-Dispatch and now defunct St. Louis Globe-Democrat, used high-risk junk bonds and the advice of his friend Michael Milken to finance his acquisitions and eventually launched the failed St. Louis Sun.

Ingersoll was bought out by his partner and financier, E.M. Warburg, Pincus & Co., which formed the Journal Register Co., the owner of 25 daily newspapers, including the New Haven Register and Alton Telegraph. The chain became the Suburban Journals of Greater St. Louis.

In 1997, it bought the Ladue News.

The company in 1999 had revenues of $151 million.

Pulitzer, which owned the Post-Dispatch and 11 other daily newspapers, in June 2000 bought the company, which then had 38 papers. It cost $165 million.

Founder's grandson Robert Donnelly, Jr. rejoined the firm as an employee of Pulitzer, Inc. 16 years after the family's sale to Ingersoll Publications Co., making him a third-generation Publisher at Suburban Journals.
 
Pulitzer later sold the group to Lee in summer 2005 for $1.46 billion.

In early 2007, Lee reorganized the chain's management and eliminated publisher positions in the nine offices.

When the chain was acquired as part of Pulitzer's purchase out by Lee in 2005, the Suburban Journals published 35 papers.
The bad economy, the effect of the Internet on the newspaper business and the weight of the debt Lee took on in the purchase of Pulitzer combined to force major layoffs and consolidation in the chain. In 2009, the chain was cut to 10 editions. Additional cuts in 2011 brought the number of editions to six. Two more editions were cut in 2013. In August 2014 the Collinsville Herald and the Granite City Press-Record were combined to create the Madison County Journal.

Feast was launched in August 2010.

Editions
Belleville Journal
Cahokia-Dupo Journal
Collinsville Herald
East St. Louis Journal
Edwardsville Journal
Granite City Press-Record
Millstadt/Smithton Enterprise
Monroe County Clarion
O'Fallon/Fairview Journal
St. Charles County Suburban Journal (two editions)

See also
Riverfront Times
St. Louis American
St. Louis Beacon

References

Sources
A 2001 Riverfront Times article about the relationship between the Post-Dispatch and Suburban Journals reporters News Hole
 An article about Ingersoll

External links
Suburban Journals website

Newspapers published in Missouri
Lee Enterprises publications